The permissible exposure limit (PEL or OSHA PEL) is a legal limit in the United States for exposure of an employee to a chemical substance or physical agent such as high level noise. Permissible exposure limits are established by the Occupational Safety and Health Administration (OSHA).  Most of OSHA's PELs were issued shortly after adoption of the Occupational Safety and Health (OSH) Act in 1970.

For chemicals, the chemical regulation is usually expressed in parts per million (ppm), or sometimes in milligrams per cubic meter (mg/m3). Units of measure for physical agents such as noise are specific to the agent.

A PEL is usually given as a time-weighted average (TWA), although some are short-term exposure limits (STEL) or ceiling limits. A TWA is the average exposure over a specified period, usually a nominal eight hours. This means that, for limited periods, a worker may be exposed to concentration excursions higher than the PEL, so long as the TWA is not exceeded and any applicable excursion limit is not exceeded. An excursion limit typically means that "...worker exposure levels may exceed 3 times the PEL-TWA for no more than a total of 30 minutes during a workday, and under no circumstances should they exceed 5 times the PEL-TWA, provided that
the PEL-TWA is not exceeded."  Excursion limits are enforced in some states (for example Oregon) and on the federal level for certain contaminants such as asbestos.

A short-term exposure limit is one that addresses the average exposure over a 15-30 minute period of maximum exposure during a single work shift. A ceiling limit is one that may not be exceeded for any time, and is applied to irritants and other materials that have immediate effects.

Regulatory agencies for occupational noise exposure

OSHA
The current PEL for OSHA  standards are based on a 5 decibel exchange rate. OSHA's PEL for noise exposure is 90 decibels (dBA) for an 8-hour TWA. Levels of 90-140 dBA are included in the noise dose. PEL can also be expressed as 100 percent “dose” for noise exposure. When the noise exposure increases by 5 dB, the exposure time is cut in half. According to OSHA, a 95dBA TWA would be a 200 percent dose. PEL is exceeded when TWA > 90 dBA. OSHA requires feasible engineering OR administrative controls, and mandatory hearing protection when the PEL is exceeded.

MSHA
Like OSHA, Mine Safety and Health Administration (MSHA) also uses the same 5 decibel exchange rate and 90 dBA for an 8-hour TWA for their PEL. Once a miner's noise exposure exceeds the PEL, feasible engineering AND administrative controls must be in place to try to limit the noise exposure of the employees. If a mine operator uses administrative controls, procedures for such controls must be posted on the bulletin board and a copy must be supplied to all affected employees.

NIOSH
The National Institute for Occupational Safety and Health (NIOSH) Recommended Exposure Limit (REL) for noise exposure uses a 3 decibel exchange rate. The recommendation for occupational noise exposure is 85 decibels (dBA) for an 8-hour TWA. For every 3 dB over 85, the exposure time is cut in half. NIOSH reports exposures above this level are considered hazardous. NIOSH uses a hierarchy of control to reduce or remove hazardous noise.

See also
Mine Safety and Health Administration
National Institute for Occupational Safety and Health
Recommended exposure limit
Threshold limit value published by ACGIH
Occupational exposure banding

References

External links
 Permissible Exposure Limits – Annotated Tables (Permissible Exposure Limits – Annotated Tables)
 1988 OSHA PEL Project Documentation: List by Chemical Name Available from NIOSH
 ACGIH website ACGIH website
 Workplace Environmental Exposure Limits (WEEL™) Values available on-line through The Occupational Alliance for Risk Science - Workplace Environmental Exposure Levels (WEEL)™

Chemical safety
Concentration indicators
Environmental standards
National Institute for Occupational Safety and Health
Occupational Safety and Health Administration